Strzebowiska  (Strubovys’ka) is a village in the administrative district of Gmina Cisna, within Lesko County, Podkarpackie Voivodeship, in south-eastern Poland, close to the border with Slovakia.

The village has a population of 50.

References

Strzebowiska